The 2011 Dakar Rally was the 33rd running of the event. It was held in Argentina and Chile for the third successive time, and ran from 1 to 16 January. The Amaury Sport Organisation and the governments of Argentina and Chile agreed to a return to South America for the event on 23 March 2010.

The rally concluded in Buenos Aires, with Vladimir Chagin of Russia achieving a record seventh victory in the truck division, at the wheel of his Kamaz, thus becoming the most successful driver in a single category in the history of the event. Nasser Al-Attiyah of Qatar and Timo Gottschalk of Germany won in the car division, giving Volkswagen their third successive victory in the car class. Marc Coma from Spain won his third Dakar in the motorcycle category, and Alejandro Patronelli of Argentina repeated the feat of his brother—Marcos Patronelli in 2010—to win the class for quad-bikes.

Entrants

407 Teams started the race with 200 motorcycles and all-terrain vehicles, 140 cars, and 67 trucks on the podium across from the Obelisk, on the 9th of July Avenue; one of Buenos Aires' major boulevards. 203 of the crews finished the event.

The route
The race began on New Year's Day in downtown Buenos Aires. Of the thirteen stages, six were in Argentina, five in Chile with two stages cross-country.

Stages

Stage results

Motorcycles
KTM's Cyril Despres won the first two stages of the rally, to take an early lead of over two minutes on fellow KTM rider Marc Coma. Coma closed the gap to just fourteen seconds after his win on the third stage, and took the overall lead on stage four with his second stage win as Despres lost over ten minutes on the stage, dropping him to second in the standings. Coma maintained his lead overall until the end of the race, taking further stage wins in stages eight, ten and twelve en route to his third victory in the event. Despres, a three-time winner himself, won stage eleven but ended the rally fifteen minutes behind Coma in second place. Aprilia's Francisco López moved into third position after the fourth stage, and having won the seventh stage, had been set to complete the podium behind Coma and Despres. However, on the final stage, López suffered a mechanical failure  from the finish line and lost over an hour to his rivals. His misfortune allowed Hélder Rodrigues, riding a Yamaha to take third place. López took fourth position, almost half an hour behind Rodrigues.

Quads

Cars

Trucks

Final overall standings

Motorcycles

Quads

Cars

Trucks

Deaths
A total of four people were killed in Dakar-related incidents during the rally. A 28-year-old female spectator was killed when a competitor lost control of his vehicle in the first stage, while two mechanics were killed in separate electrical incidents and a driver lost his life in a collision with a rally competitor following the tenth stage.

References

External links
 
 Dakar 2011 – The Big Picture

Dakar Rally
Dakar Rally
Dakar Rally
Dakar Rally
Sports competitions in Buenos Aires